Velika Štanga (in older sources also Sveti Anton, ; also , Stangen) is a settlement in the hills west of Šmartno pri Litiji in central Slovenia. The area is part of the historical region of Lower Carniola. The Municipality of Šmartno pri Litiji is now included in the Central Slovenia Statistical Region.

Church

The Štanga parish church in the settlement is dedicated to Saint Anthony of Padua and belongs to the Roman Catholic Archdiocese of Ljubljana. It dates to 1677 with some major remodelling and rebuilding carried out in 1894.

References

External links
Velika Štanga at Geopedia

Populated places in the Municipality of Šmartno pri Litiji